I Love You in Every Language in the World is a 2005 Italian romantic comedy film directed by Leonardo Pieraccioni.

Plot 
Gilberto Rovai, a teacher of physical education at a school in Pistoia, throws a surprise birthday party for his wife. However, when his wife is about to enter their home, she takes a phone call and Gilberto and his friends discover that she is having an affair. They divorce, and Gilberto goes to live with his brother Cateno, a swimming enthusiast and a janitor at Gilberto's school.

One year later, Paolina, a student of Gilberto's, becomes infatuated with him. Paolina texts him constantly with "I love you" messages in all the languages of the world. The principal of the school believes that Gilberto is in a relationship with Paolina and tries to transfer him to Borgo a Buggiano.

One evening, convinced by Anselmi, a colleague, Gilberto attends a swingers party only to find himself paired with his ex-wife. Disgusted, he leaves the party he sees a man argue and slap a woman. He befriends the woman, Margherita, and they begin to see each other regularly. One day, Gilberto discovers that Margherita is the mother of Paolina, the girl who is infatuated with him. The surprise meeting between the two has devastating effects: Gilberto faints in shock and is taken to hospital, while Paolina reacts very badly and argues with her mother. Gilberto's friend, the psychologist Bellucci, tells Gilberto that Paolina is attracted to him because she sees him as the father she has never met, and believes dead.

But Paolina's father is not dead and is now a friar, Brother Massimo, who is unaware of the existence of his daughter. Gilberto wants Margherita to tell Paolina (and the friar) the truth but she thinks it a bad idea. Gilberto then arranges a meeting between Massimo and Paolina but Massimo cannot get himself to tell her the truth about their relationship. When, finally, Margherita reveals the truth, Paolina attacks Gilberto and stones his car. He comforts her with a hug. The school principal see this and takes it as confirmation that the two are in a relationship and forces Gilberto to move to Borgo a Buggiano.

Several months later Gilberto is visited by Margherita. Cateno had sent her the many love letters that Gilberto had written, but not sent, her. Knowing that he loves her, she decides to move to Borgo a Buggiano. Meanwhile, Paolina finds her love in the son of the psychologist Bellucci.

Cast 
Leonardo Pieraccioni as Gilberto Rovai
Giorgio Panariello as Cateno
Marjo Berasategui as Margherita
Rocco Papaleo as Prof. Anselmi
Massimo Ceccherini as Brother Massimo
Giulia Elettra Gorietti as Paolina
Barbara Tabita as Debora
Francesco Guccini as the Principal
Marco Spiga as Bellucci
Nicolas Vaporidis as Bellucci's son
Barbara Enrichi as Betty uno
Cristina Bignardi as Prof. Fabiani
Monica Dugo as Priscilla
Gaetano Gennai as Ugo Panerai
Pietro Ghislandi as the traffic policeman
Francesco Tricarico, Carlo Conti, Paolo Beldì and Giovanni Veronesi as the friars

Production

Filming 
The film was shot in Pistoia, Tuscany, while the scenes at the amusement park were filmed in Gardaland.

References

External links 
 

Films directed by Leonardo Pieraccioni
Films set in Tuscany
2005 films
2000s Italian-language films
2005 romantic comedy films
Italian romantic comedy films